Logan Jared Ondrusek (born February 13, 1985) is an American professional baseball pitcher for the Uni-President Lions of the Chinese Professional Baseball League (CPBL). He has played in Major League Baseball (MLB) for the Cincinnati Reds and Baltimore Orioles, and in Nippon Professional Baseball (NPB) for the Tokyo Yakult Swallows. Ondrusek currently lives in Shiner, Texas.

Professional career

Cincinnati Reds' organization
The Cincinnati Reds selected Ondrusek in the 13th round of the 2005 MLB June Amateur Draft. Ondrusek began his minor league career with the rookie league Billings Mustangs. In his first year with the Mustangs, he went 1–6 with a 6.02 ERA. In 2006, Ondrusek pitched for Billings, Single-A Dayton and Double-A Chattanooga. In his second year, he went 4–6 with a 3.59 ERA. In 2008, Ondrusek was promoted to the Reds' Triple-A affiliate, the Louisville Bats, where he went 4–1 with a 1.50 ERA.

Ondrusek was added to the Reds' 40-man roster after the 2009 season to protect him from the Rule 5 Draft.

2010
In 2010, Ondrusek made the Reds' Opening Day roster with a strong showing in spring training, throwing 10 scoreless innings. He made his first professional appearance on Opening Day at Great American Ballpark, pitching a scoreless eighth inning against the St. Louis Cardinals. However, with an 11.12 ERA through nine appearances, Ondrusek was sent down to Triple-A Louisville on April 22. Due to injuries and struggles in the Reds' bullpen, Ondrusek was recalled to the majors on June 1. Despite a rough initial appearance upon his return to the big leagues (giving up a home run to Matt Holliday in his first game back), Ondrusek settled down, with a 1.27 ERA from his June 1 recall through August 10. This included a streak of 22 scoreless innings in 20 appearances.

He earned the first win of his MLB career on July 23 against the Houston Astros after pitching a scoreless seventh inning. Ondrusek picked up four more wins over the rest of the season, finishing the 2010 regular season 5–0 with a 3.68 ERA and 39 strikeouts over 58.2 innings.

Ondrusek pitched in both Game 1 and Game 2 of the 2010 NLDS against the Philadelphia Phillies. In the first game, he pitched 1.2 innings, allowing no hits or runs despite committing a throwing error. In Game 2, Ondrusek was brought in with two outs and the bases loaded in the sixth inning, and allowed a run on a hit batsman. However, he got the next batter to ground out, escaping the jam with minimal damage. Ondrusek finished the 2010 postseason with a 0.00 ERA with no walks in two innings pitched in two games.

2011

Ondrusek played all of 2011 with Cincinnati, where in 66 appearances, he went 5-5 with a 3.23 ERA and 14 holds, striking out 41 in 61.1 innings. Ondrusek was used mostly in the seventh and eighth innings, usually to pitch one inning per game.

2012
Ondrusek played most of 2012 with Cincinnati, but was optioned to Louisville on August 21 when the Reds were in need of a catcher after Devin Mesoraco was suspended. He was brought back up when the rosters expanded in September. In 63 appearances in 2012, Ondrusek went 5-2 with a 3.46 ERA and 13 holds, striking out 39 in 54.2 innings. He was used mostly in the 8th inning, with 32 of his appearances coming in the 8th.

2013
On January 17, 2013, Ondrusek signed a two-year, $2.35 million contract to avoid arbitration. As a Super Two player, Ondrusek was granted four years of arbitration versus the normal three.

Ondrusek began 2013 with Double-A Pensacola after a spring training in which he gave up nine runs in 10.2 innings with a WHIP of 2.062. He made three appearances with the Blue Wahoos before being recalled to Cincinnati. Ondrusek was optioned to Louisville on June 8, after an outing in which he gave up four runs. He had a 5.64 ERA and a 1.299 WHIP in 21 appearances at the time. Ondrusek returned on June 29 after Johnny Cueto went on the disabled list. Ondrusek finished the year in the Reds' bullpen. In 52 appearances with Cincinnati, he was 3-1 with a 4.09 ERA, striking out 53 in 55 innings.

2014
Ondrusek was placed on the disabled list on July 23, 2014, with right shoulder soreness. At the time, he had a 3-2 record and a 4.31 ERA in 29 appearances out of the Reds bullpen. He was activated from the DL on August 18.

Tokyo Yakult Swallows

2015
On December 29, 2014, Ondrusek signed a one-year deal with the Tokyo Yakult Swallows of the Nippon Professional Baseball. In his first season, Ondrusek posted an ERA of 2.05 in 72 games. He re-signed for the 2016 season and was named their closer. Ondrusek was suspended by the Swallows for an incident with the team's coaches in a June 26 game and was later released by the club. In his two seasons with the Swallows, he pitched in 102 games, posting an 8-3 record with 11 saves and a 2.17 ERA.

Baltimore Orioles
Ondrusek signed a major league deal on July 29, 2016, with the Baltimore Orioles after the club designated relief pitcher Chaz Roe for assignment. On November 4, the Orioles declined Ondrusek's 2017 option, making him a free agent.

On December 13, 2016, Ondrusek signed a major-league contract with the Orioles before being released on March 17, 2017.

Los Angeles Dodgers
On March 27, 2018, Ondrusek signed a minor-league contract with the Los Angeles Dodgers. He was released on July 17, 2018.

Long Island Ducks
On July 25, 2018, Ondrusek signed with the Long Island Ducks of the Atlantic League of Professional Baseball. He became a free agent following the 2018 season.

Washington Nationals
On February 6, 2019, Ondrusek signed a minor league deal with the Washington Nationals. He became a free agent following the 2019 season.

Leones de Yucatán
On December 14, 2019, Ondrusek signed with the Leones de Yucatán of the Mexican League for the 2020 season. Ondrusek did not play in a game in 2020 due to the cancellation of the Mexican League season because of the COVID-19 pandemic. On February 19, 2021, Ondrusek re-signed with the Leones for the 2021 season.

San Francisco Giants
On August 7, 2021, Ondrusek signed a minor league deal with the San Francisco Giants organization.

Uni-President Lions
On January 14, 2022, Ondrusek signed with the Uni-President Lions of the Chinese Professional Baseball League.

Pitching style
Ondrusek mostly uses three pitches: a four-seam fastball averaging about 92–93 mph, a slider around 80 mph, and a cutter in the low 90s. He also has a sinker and a changeup, which is used primarily against lefties. He throws with a straight-over-the-top motion.

References

External links

1985 births
Living people
People from Hallettsville, Texas
Baseball players from Texas
American people of Czech descent
Major League Baseball pitchers
Nippon Professional Baseball pitchers
American expatriate baseball players in Japan
American expatriate baseball players in Mexico
American expatriate baseball players in Taiwan
Cincinnati Reds players
Tokyo Yakult Swallows players
Baltimore Orioles players
McLennan Highlanders baseball players
Billings Mustangs players
Dayton Dragons players
Chattanooga Lookouts players
Sarasota Reds players
Carolina Mudcats players
Louisville Bats players
Peoria Saguaros players
Pensacola Blue Wahoos players
Bowie Baysox players
Tulsa Drillers players
Oklahoma City Dodgers players
Long Island Ducks players
Harrisburg Senators players
Fresno Grizzlies players
Leones de Yucatán players
Uni-President Lions players